Axel Julius de la Gardie (1637–1710) was a Swedish Field Marshal and was appointed Governor-General over Estonia.

Axel Julius was the son of military commander Jacob De la Gardie and Ebba Brahe. He became colonel of an infantry regiment and a cavalry regiment and in 1684 he attained the rank of major general in the cavalry, and was a colonel in the Royal Guard. In 1668 he became lieutenant general and finally, later, Field Marshal.

Upon the threat of war with Russia, he received orders to command the troops in Finland and Ingria and take necessary defensive actions. At the landtag he held in 1676 in Åbo, the government granted the request of new war efforts.

He married Sofia Juliana Arvidsdotter Forbus in 1664

1637 births
1710 deaths
Field marshals of Sweden
Governors-General of Sweden
Swedish nobility
17th-century Swedish military personnel
Swedish people of French descent
17th-century Swedish politicians
Axel Julius